Poland is a part of the global tourism market with constantly increasing number of visitors. Tourism in Poland contributes to the country's overall economy. The most popular cities are Kraków, Warsaw, Wrocław, Gdańsk, Poznań, Szczecin, Lublin, Toruń, Zakopane, the Salt Mine in Wieliczka and the historic site of Auschwitz – A German Nazi concentration camp in Oświęcim. The best recreational destinations include Poland's Masurian Lake District, Baltic Sea coast, Tatra Mountains (the highest mountain range of Carpathians), Sudetes and Białowieża Forest. Poland's main tourist offers consist of sightseeing within cities, historical monuments, natural monuments, business trips, agrotourism, bicycle touring, qualified tourism, mountain hiking (trekking) and climbing among others.

Overview

In the 21st century, Poland is one of the safest countries in Europe, frequently visited by tourists.

Poland, especially after joining the European Union in 2004 and acceding to the Schengen Agreement in 2007, became a place frequently visited by tourists. Most tourist attractions in Poland are connected with natural environment, historic sites and cultural events.

According to Tourist Institute's data, Poland was visited by 15.7 million tourists in 2006, and by 15 million tourists in 2007, out of the number of arrivals 66.2 million. In 2012, Poland was visited by 13.5 million foreign tourists (those who came during Euro 2012, but did not stay overnight, were not included in official statistics). In 2013, Poland was visited by 15.8 million tourists. In 2016, the number of arrivals to Poland amounted to 80.5 million. 17.5 million of this number are arrivals considered for tourism purposes (with at least one night's stay). In 2019, Poland was visited by 21.4 million tourists, making it the 18th most visited country in the world.

History
The first Polish tourists were pilgrims traveling to shrines both within Poland and abroad. The development of commercial tourism began in the 19th century. The most popular regions were mountains, especially the Tatra Mountains, explored for example by Tytus Chałubiński. In 1873, the Polish Tatra Society and in 1909 the Polish Sightseeing Society were established to organize and develop tourism. The 19th century was also the time of the rapid appearance of spa resorts, mostly in Sudetes, Beskids and along the Baltic Sea coast, with some of them associated, since 1910, with the Polish Balneology Association. After Poland regained independence in 1918, Polish tourism boomed, and was encouraged by the government. The first professional Polish tour operator, Orbis, was founded in Lwów in 1923, followed in 1937 by Gromada tourist organization and tour operator.

After World War II all tourist organizations were nationalized by the new communist government. The Polish Tatra Society and Polish Sightseeing Society were combined into Polish Tourism-Sightseeing Society (PTTK) and most of the tourist infrastructure was handed over to the newly created Workers Vacations Fund (FWP). Tourism was limited to the Comecon countries. This was the era of governmentally-founded tourism, characterised by mass but low-standard tourism. A typical sight was a holiday campground with small bungalows managed by one of the state-owned companies. Holidays for children and teenagers were organized by Juventur.

After the fall of communism much of the infrastructure was privatized, although many company-owned resorts were downgraded because of their unprofitability. The early 1990s saw the foundation of many new tour operators. Some of them prevailed and strengthened their position on the market, being able to compete with multinational tour operators.

Natural environment

Poland has a diversified natural environment, which is relatively unaffected by human development. There are 23 national parks in the country that meet the criteria of the IUCN. Visitors are attracted by mountains, sea-coast with wide sandy beaches, and forests, lakes, rivers. Among the most popular destinations are: Tatra Mountains, in which is the highest peak of Poland (Rysy) and the famous Orla Perć (old trail in the style of via ferrata); Sudetes with Main Sudetes Trail (440 km from Świeradów Zdrój to Prudnik), Karkonosze, Table Mountains, Owl Mountains; Białowieża Forest, Lower Silesian Wilderness, Bieszczady, Dunajec River Gorge in Pieniny, Pojezierze Mazurskie and many others.

Popular Tourist destinations

 The Royal Road of Kraków
 Tourist attractions in Warsaw
 Wrocław Zoo (most frequently visited attraction in Poland)
 Hunting on the Wrocław's dwarfs
 Wrocław Old Town including Ostrów Tumski with Wrocław Cathedral; Market Square with Wrocław Old City Hall; Centennial Hall, Wrocław Opera
 Old Town in Gdańsk
 Modernist Center of Gdynia
 The Royal-Imperial Route in Poznań
 Jewish Heritage Trail in Bialystok
 European Route of Brick Gothic
 Białowieża National Park
 Dunajec River Gorge
 Tatra Mountains
 Karkonosze Mountains
 Kraków Old Town
 Auschwitz-Birkenau State Museum
 Krasiński Palace
 13th century Wieliczka Salt Mine
 Medieval Town of Toruń
 Old City of Zamość
 Wilanów Palace
 Jasna Góra Monastery in Częstochowa
 Cistercian Lubiąż Abbey
 Cistercian Krzeszów Abbey
 Royal Gniezno Cathedral
 Wooden Churches of Southern Little Poland
 Wooden Churches of Peace in Jawor and Świdnica
 Sanctuary in Kalwaria Zebrzydowska
 Poznań Old Town and its Ostrów Tumski, Poznań
 Mount Ślęża in the Sudetes
 Kłodzko Fortress complex
 Pszczyna Palace
 Augustów Canal with sluices
 Benedictine Abbey in Tyniec
 Muskau Park shared with Germany
 Palace on the Isle
 Frombork Cathedral
 Łańcut Palace
 Kozłówka Palace
 Historic town of Sandomierz
 Kazimierz Dolny
 National Museum in Warsaw
 Seaside resort of Sopot
 Branicki Palace
 Historic town of Kłodzko
 Elbląg Canal
 Spa town of Kudowa-Zdrój
 Palace of the Kraków Bishops in Kielce
 Historic town of Wadowice
 Czartoryski Museum
 National Museum in Wrocław
 National Museum in Poznań
 Święta Lipka Basilica
 Historical town of Przemyśl
 Seaside resort of Kołobrzeg
 Juliusz Słowacki Theatre
 Ląd Abbey
 Historic town of Jelenia Góra
 Zakopane; known as "the winter capital of Poland"
 Spa town of Karpacz
 Royal Baths Park
 Collegiate Church of St. Mary and St. Alexius in Tum
 Pławniowice Palace
 Project Riese
 Wolf's Lair
WUWA

Castles 

Wawel Royal Castle
Royal Castle in Warsaw
Niedzica Castle
Malbork Castle
Baranów Sandomierski Castle
Książ Castle
Nowy Wiśnicz Castle
Czocha Castle
Moszna Castle
Ujazdowski Castle
Imperial Castle, Poznań
Grodziec Castle
Krasiczyn Castle
Pieskowa Skała
Lidzbark Warmiński Castle
Kwidzyn Castle
Gołuchów Castle
Kliczków Castle
Golub-Dobrzyń Castle
Krzyżtopór
Ogrodzieniec Castle
Rzeszów Castle
Dunajec river castles
Chojnik Castle
Kórnik Castle
Bobolice Castle
Będzin Castle
Pomeranian Dukes' Castle, Szczecin
Bytów Castle
Tenczyn Castle
Bolków Castle
Czersk Castle
Ciechanów Castle
Lublin Castle
Uniejów Castle
Darłowo Castle
Bielsko-Biała Museum and Castle
Sanok Castle
Dzików Castle

Cultural events

Warsaw
 International Frederick Chopin Piano Competition
 Warsaw Autumn Music Festival
 Warsaw International Film Festival
 Jazz Jamboree
 Orange Warsaw Festival
 Ursynalia – Warsaw Student Festival
 Festival of Jewish Culture in Warsaw
 Warsaw Jewish Film Festival
 Warsaw Comic Con
 Parada Równości
Kraków
 Live Music Festival
 Kraków Film Festival
 Jewish Culture Festival in Kraków
 Conrad Festival
 Floating of the Wreaths (Wianki)
 Kraków Szopka Nativity Crèche Festival
 International Film Festival Etiuda&Anima
 International Festival of Independent Cinema Off Plus Camera
 Kraków Equality March
Wrocław
 Wratislavia Cantans
 New Horizons Film Festival
 Festival of Good Beer
 American Film Festival

Poznań
 ANIMATOR (festival)
 Henryk Wieniawski Violin Competition
 Malta Festival
 Poznań International Fair
 Short Waves Festival
 Off Cinema Film Festival
 Ale Kino! International Young Audience Film Festival
Tricity
 St. Dominic's Fair in Gdańsk
 Sopot International Song Festival
 Open'er Festival in Gdynia
 Gdynia Film Festival
 Gdańsk Shakespeare Festival
Łódź
 Transatlantyk Festival
 International Festival of Comics and Games
 Soundedit Festival
 Łódź Design Festival
 Łódź Biennale
Katowice
 Grzegorz Fitelberg International Competition for Conductors
 Off Festival in Katowice
Other
 Camerimage Film Festival in Toruń
 Pol'and'Rock Festival in Kostrzyn nad Odrą
 National Festival of Polish Song in Opole
 International Cycling Film Festival
 Szczecin Festival of Contemporary Painting
 Two Riversides Film and Art Festival in Kazimierz Dolny

Tourist resorts

There are dozens of sea resorts on the coast of Baltic Sea like Wolin Island, located close to the German border and the coast of Pomerania. In southern Poland there are resorts for skiing and hiking in the Karkonosze mountains, which is part of the Sudetes mountain range. Karkonosze includes the tourist centres of Karpacz and Szklarska Poręba. Other famous resorts for skiing and hiking include in Carpathian Mountains: Zakopane in the Tatra mountains; Szczyrk, Krynica-Zdrój, Ustroń, Wisła in the Beskids or Szczawnica and Krościenko in Pieniny mountains.

Christian pilgrimage

It's estimated that 13% (of the 1.8 million in 2005) of visitors of the Basilica of Our Lady of Licheń arrive from abroad. Jasna Góra Monastery was visited by 3.6 million of pilgrims from 78 countries in 2014.

Transport in Poland

Tourist infrastructure and facilities are abundant, especially in larger cities and in major tourist resorts. In large Polish cities, urban public transport is very well developed.

The biggest cities (Kraków, Wrocław, Poznań, Gdańsk and Szczecin) have international airports with connections with many European cities and with the Frédéric Chopin International Airport in Warsaw, which is the main hub of LOT Polish Airlines.

Intercity connections are offered by PKP Intercity, Polregio, Arriva RP, Leo Express, RegioJet, local trains (Koleje Dolnośląskie, Koleje Śląskie, Koleje Małopolskie, Szybka Kolej Miejska, Pomorska Kolej Metropolitalna, Koleje Mazowieckie, Łódzka Kolej Aglomeracyjna, Koleje Wielkopolskie) and PKS's, Flixbus as well as many smaller companies. There are also coach connections to other countries provided by various companies (inter alia Sindbad, Flixbus).

Connections by ferry to Sweden and Denmark through the Baltic Sea are for example from Gdańsk, Gdynia and Świnoujście (inter alia Polferries).

See also 
 Polish Tourist and Sightseeing Society
 Mountain Volunteer Search and Rescue
 Tatra Volunteer Search and Rescue
 Crown of Polish Mountains
 List of spa towns in Poland

References

 Poland national tourism office
 Useful information site about Poland
 Poland's Official Travel Website
 Visiting Poland – All in One Travel Guide

Further reading 
 Kaszynski, Tadeusz, Through Europe to Poland by Car, 1st and rev. ed., New York City, 1968

 
Poland